Henry F. Vaughan (January 4, 1883 – September 6, 1951) was an American football player and coach. He served as the head coach at Ohio State University in 1911 and Fordham University in the 1915, compiling a career record of 9–7–2.

Vaughan was the tenth head coach of the Ohio State Buckeyes football team and served for a single season in 1911. On the recommendation of Ohio State's previous football coach, Howard Jones, the university's athletic board hired Vaughan, an All-American from Yale University. Vaughan resigned after leading Ohio State to a 5–3–2 record and returned to Yale for a law degree. In 1915, he became head coach at Fordham University, staying for only one season and tallying a record of 4–4.

He played college football at Yale and was selected as a second-team All-American end in 1909 by The New York Times.

He died in 1951 and was buried in Arlington National Cemetery.

Head coaching record

References

1883 births
1951 deaths
American football ends
Fordham Rams football coaches
Ohio State Buckeyes football coaches
Yale Bulldogs football players